is an unfinished manga series written and illustrated by Osamu Tezuka. Tezuka considered Phoenix his "life's work"; it consists of 12 books, each of which tells a separate, self-contained story and takes place in a different era. The plots go back and forth from the remote future to prehistoric times. The story was never completed, having been cut short by Tezuka's death in 1989.

Several of the stories have been adapted into anime series and OVAs, and a live-action film. As of 2007, the entire manga series is available in English-language translations.

Overview
Phoenix is about reincarnation. Each story generally involves a search for immortality, embodied by the blood of the eponymous bird of fire, which, as drawn by Tezuka, resembles the Fenghuang. The blood is believed to grant eternal life, but immortality in Phoenix is either unobtainable or a terrible curse, whereas Buddhist-style reincarnation is presented as the natural path of life. The stories spring back and forth through time; the first, Dawn, takes place in ancient times, and the second, Future, takes place in the far future. Subsequent stories alternate between the past and future, allowing Tezuka to explore his themes in both historical and science fiction settings. Throughout the stories there are various recurring characters, some from Tezuka's famous star system. A character named Saruta appears repeatedly, for example, in the form of various ancestors and descendants, all of whom endure harsh trials in their respective eras.

Tezuka began work on a preliminary version of Phoenix in 1954, and the series continued in various forms until his death in 1989. As it progresses, the stories seemed to be converging on the present day. Due to Tezuka dying before the manga's completion, it is not known how this would have played out. Scholar and translator Frederik L. Schodt, who knew Tezuka in life, wrote that he fantasized about a secret ending, "waiting in a safe somewhere to be revealed posthumously". This was not the case, and Tezuka's final intentions with Phoenix remain unknown; its episodic nature leaves each volume highly accessible nonetheless. Many of the Phoenix stories feature an intensely experimental layout and visual design. For example, Universe tells the story of four spacefarers who are forced to leave their spaceship in separate escape pods. The panels of the story are organized such that each character has his own vertical or horizontal tier on the page, emphasizing the astronauts' isolation; the tiers combine and separate as characters join and split up. In an astonishing sequence after one character's death, he is represented for a number of pages by a series of empty black panels.

Tezuka was said to have been influenced to create the series after listening to the music of Igor Stravinsky. He also told that he created the image of Phoenix as he was impressed by the Firebird in director Ivan Ivanov-Vano's animation film Konyok Gorbunok (Soyuzmultfilm studio).

Arcs
After several aborted attempts at a first chapter in the 1950s published in the magazine Manga Shōnen, Tezuka began Dawn in 1967, serialized in COM. The serialization of Phoenix would continue throughout his career, moving to Manga Shōnen after COM's closure in the mid-70s. The final volume, Sun, was serialized in The Wild Age.

The first volume, originally serialized in 1967. This story took place in 240–70 AD, in the era of Queen Himiko of the Yamatai. Using her army, led by feudal general Sarutahiko, to invade the Kumaso, she seeks the Phoenix and eternal youth.

The second volume, originally serialized in 1967–68. In Phoenix'''s chronology, this is the final story chronologically, taking place near the end of mankind. In 3404, the world has become super-modernized, but humanity has reached its peak and shows decline. A young man named Masato Yamanobe is living with his girlfriend, Tamami, a shapeshifting alien. Pursued by Masato's boss, Rock, they eventually take shelter at the isolated base of mad scientist Dr. Saruta, who attempts to preserve life on Earth with the assistance of his robot, Robita. Eventually, nuclear war breaks out.

The third volume, originally serialized in 1968–69. This story took place in 320–50 (Kofun period), and is based on the Yamato-takeru-no-mikoto legend. The decadent king of Yamato is trying to have his own version of Japan's history written. Meanwhile, a "barbarian" tribe, the Kumaso, is writing an unbiased history. The king of Yamato sends his youngest son, Oguna, to murder the barbarian chief, Takeru. On his journey, Oguna encounters the Phoenix.

The fourth volume, originally serialized in 1969; also known as Space. The story took place in 2577 AD, where four astronauts must escape their ruined spaceship in escape pods. The survivors eventually crash into a mysterious planet. Among them is Saruta, who contends with Makimura for the heart of their female companion, Nana. On this strange planet, they eventually meet the Phoenix.

The fifth volume, originally serialized in 1969–1970. The story occurred in 720–752 AD (the period in which the Daibutsu of Tōdai-ji was built), during the Nara period. One-eyed and one-armed young man Gao, an ancestor of Saruta, turns into a murderous bandit when he is rejected by his village. He attacks a sculptor, Akanemaru, and the two men's paths diverge, but their fates remain linked. Akanemaru becomes obsessed with the Phoenix to the point that he loses sight of his original dreams, while Gao eventually finds a state of grace despite his continuing hardships. Hō-ō is widely considered the masterpiece of the Phoenix series. MSX and Famicom video games, both developed by Konami, were based on this volume. The Viz (English) edition is entitled "Karma".

The sixth volume, originally serialized in 1970–1971. The story took place in 2482–3344 AD. In an age of robotics, technology and science, young Leon dies in a car accident. He is returned to life by scientific surgery, but his now mostly-artificial brain makes him see living things – including humans – as distorted clay figures, while he sees machines and robots as beauties. Leon falls in love with a worker robot, Chihiro, whom he sees as a beautiful girl, and would fight for this forbidden love. He would also find out the secret behind his accident. A side plot features the robot Robita, who previously appeared in Future.

Serialized in COM, 1971. Published in English by Viz as an appendix to the second volume of Civil War (Turbulent Times). Based on the story of the Hagoromo.

Published in COM, 1971; continued in Manga Shōnen, 1976–1978. A science fiction epic about the rise and fall of civilization on the deceptively named desert planet of Eden and one boy's universe-spanning search for the planet of his ancestors: Earth. Features numerous cameos from other Science fiction-based Phoenix stories, including the shapeshifting alien "Moopies" first seen in Future, Makimura from Universe and an early model of the Chihiro robot from Resurrection. Black Jack also made an appearance here, under a different name.

Published in Manga Shōnen, 1978–1980. The story is about a woodcutter named Benta and his childhood sweetheart, Obu, who are separated and caught up in the events of the Genpei War. Various historical figures, such as Taira no Kiyomori, appear as major and minor characters. Although the character of Gao (from Ho-ō) appears as a 400-year-old hermit and thus links Ranse-hen to the rest of the series, this particular arc stands out for its much more naturalistic approach, with next to no fantasy elements in it (except for those used for comedic effect, such as telephones in the 12th century). The Viz (English) edition is entitled Civil War and is split into two volumes, with Robe of Feathers included as an appendix to the second volume.

Published in Manga Shōnen, 1980. A TV producer who attempts to procure human clones to use in a The Most Dangerous Game-style reality TV program learns the error of his ways when he is mistaken for a clone himself. This episode is notable for only featuring the Phoenix in flashbacks and also for introducing her half-human daughter who does not appear again after this episode.

Published in Manga Shōnen, 1981. The story of a female Buddhist nun (bhikkhuni) who is imprisoned in a time-warp by the Phoenix as punishment for her sins along with her faithful retainer and is forced to become a healer treating the victims of wars from all over time and space including humans, youkai and various extraterrestrials. This chapter was loosely based on the Hyakki Yakō emakimono by the famous Japanese artist Tosa Mitsunobu (although in the context of the story it's the complete opposite).

Published in The Wild Age, 1986–88. This is the longest story, and was the final volume completed before Tezuka's death. It centers on Harima, a young Korean soldier from the Baekje Kingdom whose head is replaced with that of a wolf by Tang Dynasty soldiers following the defeat of the joint Baekje-Yamato force at the Battle of Baekgang. He then escapes to Japan where he becomes the feudal lord Inugami and becomes caught in the middle of the Jinshin War, as well as joining a greater battle between supernatural forces and time-travelling to a bleak future world ruled by a theocracy that claimed to have captured the Phoenix. This chapter stands in stark contrast to the earlier historical Phoenix stories, which tended to de-mythologize the mythical characters therein, for instance in Dawn, many Shinto gods are portrayed as mere humans. In this chapter, however, a wide variety of mythical creatures are shown fighting against Bodhisattva.
Early Works
Covers the prototype version of the series from the 1950s.

Characters
 Hi no Tori: Keiko Takeshita/Suzanne Gilad
 Saruta: Tetsuo Komura/Danny Burstein
 Narrator: Akira Kume/Robert O'Gorman
Dawn
 Nagi: Takeuchi Junko/Michelle Newman
 Sarutahiko: Tetsuo Komura
 Himiko: Ryōko Kinomiya/Fiona Jones
 Hinaku: Sakiko Tamagawa/Carrie Keranen
 Susanoo: Eizo Tsuda/James Urbaniak
 Guzuri: Michio Nakao/Jay Snyder
 Ama no Yumihiko: Masaki Terasoma/Addie Blaustein
 Ninigi: Akio Ōtsuka/Richard Epcar
 Shaman: Hikaru Miyata
 Soldier: Yousuke Akimoto
 Uzume: Yumi Nakatani/Erica Schroeder
 Uraji: Yūsaku Yara/Marc Diraison
 Ojiji: Eisuke Yoda/Richard Springle
 Obaba: Natsuko Sebata
 Soldier: Dai Matsumoto
 Kumaso Takeru: Daisuke Namikawa
 Yazuchi: Hirofumi Nojima
 Fuki: Akiko Nakagawa
 Tajikarao: Toshihide Tsuchiya
 Kamamushi: Shōzō Iizuka/David Brimmer
 Chamberlain: Mahito Tsujimura
Resurrection
 Leona: Sasaki Nozomu/Christopher Kromer
 Lamp: Masashi Hirose/Mike Pollock
 Chihiro: Misa Kobayashi/Eden Riegel
 Nielsen: Shinji Ogawa/Ted Lewis
 Reiko: Fumiko Osaka/Kathleen McInerney
 Leona's Father: Mantarô Iwao/Marc Thompson
 Young Leona: Reiko Takagi/Christopher Kromer
Strange creatures
 Sakonnosuke: Mayumi Asano/Kathleen McInerney
 Yagi Iemasa: Tetsuo Komura
 Yaobikuni: Tamie Kubota
 Kahei: Bin Shimada/Mike Pollock
 Haniwa Jindayu: Kazuhiko Kishino

Sun
 Inugami no Sukune/Harima: Yasunori Matsumoto/Gary Littman
 Obaba: Seiko Tomoe/Barbara Goodson
 Azumi-no-Muraji Saruta: Tetsuo Komura
 Marimo: Ai Uchikawa/Michelle Ruff
 Emperor Tenji: Masaru Ikeda/Steven Jay Blum
 Ōama no Miko: Naoya Uchida/Crispin Freeman
 Ibukimaru: Daisuke Gouri/Michael McConnohie
 Empress Consort: Atsuko Koganezawa
 Ōtomo no Miko: Hiroshi Kamiya/Liam O'Brien
 Prince Takechi: Kenji Nojima/Sebastian Arcelus
 Tang General: Koichi Sakaguchi
 Soldier: Kouji Haramaki
 Hoben: Tamio Ohki/Richard Toth
 Getsudan: Hisao Egawa
 Nichidan: Hiroshi Iwasaki
 Mokudan: Kousei Hirota
 Kadan: Naomi Kusumi
 Kokushi: Yutaka Nakano
 Rubetsu: Takayuki Sugo/Jay Snyder
 Iki no Karakuni: Takeshi Watabe/Richard Epcar
 Soga no Hatayasu: Yuzuru Fujimoto/John Avner
 Soga no Yasumaro: Eiji Yanagisawa
Future
 Masato Yamanobe: Daisuke Namikawa/Michael Sinterniklaas
 Robita: Shigeru Ushiyama
 Rock: Takuya Kirimoto/Eric Stuart
 Old Masato: Osamu Saka/Michael McConnohie
 Tamami: Yumi Touma/Stephanie Sheh
 Girl: Akiko Nakagawa
 Adam: Takahiro Mizushima

Publication

English editionPhoenix is currently published in English by Viz Communications. Although the second volume was initially published by the now defunct Pulp manga anthology in a larger edition, in 2002, Viz took over the rest of the manga series, and re-released the second volume. Frederik Schodt, Jared Cook, Shinji Sakamoto, and Midori Ueda, members of a Tokyo group called "Dadakai", had already translated the first five volumes of the series around 1977/78, but after handing these translation to Tezuka Productions, they collected dust for nearly twenty-five years. Finally, Schodt and Cook finished translating the rest of the series and Viz published the entire series in English, starting in 2002 and completing it in March 2008. It has been criticized for being a dumbing-down, including overlapping artwork with unnecessary new narration, and altering character names (such as Sarutahiko to Saruta) to make their reincarnations more obvious to the reader. However, Tezuka was known to update his manga every few years, so the U.S. version could reflect the last known edition of the series.

The Viz editions are released "flipped" (the original right-to-left orientation is reversed for easier reading in English). Some of the shorter stories have been consolidated into one book (based on the Japanese publication), and Troubled Times has been split across two; this resulted in each Viz book having a similar page count. While many of the actual Viz books are out of print, they became available again through digital purchase on Kindle. Viz later offered the digital version of Phoenix manga in 2014.

Volumes in English

Vol. 1 – Dawn
Released March 2003.
Vol. 2 – A Tale of the Future / Future
This volume was released first, in May 2002, as a stand-alone graphic novel; Dawn was released a year later, as Vol. 1, followed by the rest of the series. A Tale of the Future was initially released in a larger size; the series releases, starting with Dawn, are digest-sized. A Tale of the Future was reprinted in the smaller size in 2004, titled Future, with Vol. 2 appended to the title.
Vol. 3 – Yamato / Space
Collects Yamato and Space in one book; released November 2003.
Vol. 4 – Karma
Originally titled Ho-ō; released May 2004. Listed at #2 in Time Magazine's "Best Comix of 2004".
Vol. 5 – Resurrection
Released December 14, 2004.
Vol. 6 – Nostalgia
Released March 26, 2006.
Vol. 7 – Civil War, Part 1
Originally titled Troubled Times, and here split into two books; the first was released June 13, 2006.
Vol. 8 – Civil War, Part 2 / Robe of Feathers
Collects the ending of Troubled Times, and includes Robe of Feathers; released September 12, 2006.
Vol. 9 – Strange Beings / Life
Collects Strange Beings and Life in one book; released December 19, 2006.
Vol. 10 – Sun, Part 1
Released March 20, 2007.
Vol. 11 – Sun, Part 2
Released September 18, 2007.
Vol. 12 – Early Works
Released March 18, 2008.

Adaptations
Live-action film
A live-action film entitled Hi no Tori, based on the Dawn storyline, directed by Kon Ichikawa and including some animated sequences directed by Tezuka, was released in 1978. The cast included Tomisaburo Wakayama and Tatsuya Nakadai. It was released in the United States on VHS by Video Action under the cover title The Phoenix (Hinotori) in 1982, using a subtitled print, letterboxed only in the split-screen sequence. To date, the film is available on DVD only in Spain, where it is titled Fénix. The film included a brief appearance by Astro Boy, substituting for another character to illustrate his attempts to get on a horse. The score was co-composed by Michel Legrand and Jun Fukamachi.

Anime
Several volumes of Phoenix were adapted into anime. The best-known feature film, Phoenix 2772, loosely adapts elements from various Phoenix volumes and other Tezuka works into a complete whole cloth scenario. A second animated feature, Phoenix: Karma Chapter was released on December 20, 1986, and was later succeeded by two sequel OVAs, Yamato Chapter and Space Chapter, in 1987.

A 13-episode anime television series also aired in 2004 in Japan, and was released in English in October 2007 by Anime Works. The anime premiered in Jamaica on CVM Television in June 2017.

A new anime adaptation by Studio 4°C, titled Phoenix: Eden17, is scheduled for streaming worldwide on Disney+ in 2023.

Episode list

Video games
A MSX adaptation of Karma was created by Konami. The Phoenix also made a cameo appearance in the 2003 Astro Boy series and 2004 Astro Boy: Omega Factor game for the Nintendo Game Boy Advance, along with a number of other Tezuka characters.

 Hi no Tori Hououhen (1987, MSX2)
 Hi no Tori Hououhen: Gaou no Bouken (1987, Famicom)
 Black Jack Hinotorihen (2006, Nintendo DS)
 DS de Yomu Series: Tezuka Osamu Hi no Tori 1 (2008, Nintendo DS)
 DS de Yomu Series: Tezuka Osamu Hi no Tori 2 (2008, Nintendo DS)
 DS de Yomu Series: Tezuka Osamu Hi no Tori 3 (2008, Nintendo DS)

Reception and legacyPhoenix is considered one of the greatest manga of all time, and is often ranked as one of Tezuka's greatest manga. In 2006, Phoenix ranked 1st in the Japan Media Arts Festival's special 'experts' ranking (consisting of critics, editors, people working in the industry, etc.) for the greatest manga of all time, which it held to mark its 10th anniversary. In a 2009 poll held by Asahi Shimbun for 'Greatest Shōwa Manga', Phoenix ranked 12th, the 3rd highest Tezuka manga behind Astro Boy and Black Jack. Mangaka Naoki Urasawa has spoken about how the first time he read Phoenix he was shocked that a work of this quality existed, and that since reading it, he has never been as significantly impacted by anything since, so much so that he would mark it as the moment he became an adult. The titular Phoenix is considered an icon of manga, and a sculpture of the character is featured as a prominent permanent exhibition in the Kyoto International Manga Museum. A statute of the Phoenix is also featured outside the Osamu Tezuka Manga Museum.

The Resurrection arc of Phoenix inspired the lyrical theme of the 2018 song "M.D.O." by heavy metal band Lovebites. In celebration of what would have been Tezuka's 90th birthday, Evil Line Records released the compilation album New Gene, Inspired from Phoenix on October 30, 2019. It features songs inspired by Phoenix written and performed by various artists, including Glim Spanky, Kizuna AI, Tavito Nanao and Naotarō Moriyama.

Notes

See also
 List of Osamu Tezuka anime
 List of Osamu Tezuka manga
 Osamu Tezuka
 Osamu Tezuka's Star System

References

External links
 Tezuka Osamu @World , Tezuka's official site (in Japanese and English)
 Official Phoenix Page at publisher VIZ Media, LLC
 
 Animerica review
  (Hi no tori, live-action film, 1978)
  (Hi no tori 2772: Ai no kosumozôn, anime film, 1980)
  (Hi no tori: Hôô-hen, anime film, 1986)
  (Hi no tori: Yamato-hen, OVA, 1987)
  (Hi no tori: Uchû-hen'', OVA, 1987)

1967 manga
1978 films
1980 anime films
1986 anime films
1987 anime OVAs
2004 anime television series debuts
2023 anime ONAs
Anime series based on manga
Animated films based on manga
Fantasy anime and manga
Films directed by Rintaro
Live-action films based on manga
Manga adapted into films
NHK original programming
Osamu Tezuka anime
Osamu Tezuka characters
Osamu Tezuka manga
Unfinished comics
Phoenixes in popular culture
Shōnen manga
Studio 4°C
Tezuka Productions
Viz Media manga
Gekiga
Gekiga by Osamu Tezuka
Video games developed in Japan
Cultural depictions of Himiko